Lluís Bagaria i Bou (1882 in Barcelona – 1940 in Havana) one of the most important Spanish caricaturists in the first half of the 20th century. His drawings, in a synthetic and decorative style, were published in the most important journals of Spain, including L'Esquella de la Torratxa and ¡Cu-Cut!  between 1906 and 1940.

He was born in Barcelona, but it was in Madrid where he achieved great popularity and fame. He published in the journal El Sol and drew the covers of  magazine. His caricatures against fascism during the war provoked his exile to Paris and into Cuba.

Bibliography
 Luis Bagaría. Dibujos humorísticos. Cat. Expo. La Habana: Museo Nacional Masónico Aurelio Miranda Álvarez, 1958
 Luis Bagaria, 1882-1940, Cat. Expo. Madrid: Biblioteca Nacional / Ministerio de Cultura, 1983
 Antonio ELORZA. Luis Bagaría. El humor y la política. Barcelona: Anthropos, 1988
 Lluís Bagaria. Caricaturista del món barceloní. Cat. Expo. Sabadell: Museu d'art de Sabadell, 2003
 Emilio MARCOS VILLALÓN. Luis Bagaria. Entre el arte y la política. Madrid: Biblioteca Nueva, 2004
 Bagaría en El Sol. Política y humor en la crisis de la restauración. Cat. Expo. Madrid: Fundación Mapfre, 2007
 Jaume CAPDEVILA. Bagaria. La guerra no fa riure. Barcelona: Dux Elm, 2007

References 

Spanish caricaturists
Exiles of the Spanish Civil War in France
1882 births
1940 deaths
Exiles of the Spanish Civil War in Cuba
Artists from Barcelona